Gradius 2 may refer to:

 Gradius 2, a 1987 computer game.
 Gradius II, a 1988 arcade game.

These are two games in the same series, but they are otherwise unrelated.